is a Japanese light novel series written by Shiina Howahowa and illustrated by Yamaada. It began serialization online in January 2013 on the user-generated novel publishing website Shōsetsuka ni Narō, and it moved to the AlphaPolis website in August 2016. It was also later acquired by AlphaPolis, who have published twenty-seven volumes since February 2014. A manga adaptation illustrated by Shūya Rikudō began serialization online via AlphaPolis' manga website in May 2014 and has been collected in ten tankōbon volumes. The manga is published digitally in English through Alpha Manga. An anime television series adaptation has been announced.

Media

Light novel

Manga

Anime
An anime television series adaptation was announced on February 10, 2023.

Reception
The series won "The AlphaPolis 6th Fantasy Novel Grand Prize" reader award, and has 1.5 million copies in circulation.

Volumes of the manga adaptation have ranked on the Oricon bestseller chart.

References

External links
 
 
 

2014 Japanese novels
Anime and manga based on light novels
Fantasy anime and manga
Japanese webcomics
Light novels
Light novels first published online
Massively multiplayer online role-playing games in fiction
Shōnen manga
Shōsetsuka ni Narō
Upcoming anime television series
Webcomics in print